Gaurishankar Bisen (born 1 January 1952) is a former cabinet minister in Government of Madhya Pradesh. He represents as a Member of Legislative Assembly from Balaghat constituency of Madhya Pradesh since 2008. He is a member and leader of Bharatiya Janata Party.

Early life
Gauri Shankar Bisen is a member of the Bhartiya Janta Party. He is a son of Chaturbhuj Bisen. He was born in Panwar Rajput community and educated at Jata Shankar Trivedi Post Graduate College, Balaghat, Sagar University, Sagar (Madhya Pradesh). He has two daughters, Mousam and Payal. His wife Smt. Rekha Gaurishankar Bisen was previously chairperson of the Balaghat Jila Panchayat. His nickname "Bhau" was known in the area of Balaghat and the Seoni district. He is a famous politician of Balaghat disctric.

Political career
In 1978-80 he was the director of District Cooperative Bank, Balaghat, and Land Development Bank, Balaghat.
On 10 March 1985, Bisen was elected to the 8th Vidhan Sabha from the Balaghat Legislative Constituency of Madhya Pradesh. He has been elected five times for the Madhya Pradesh Legislative Assembly. He was elected to the 13th Vidhan Sabha Balaghat Legislative Constituency of Madhya Pradesh, with a margin of over 10,000 votes on 8 December 2008. In 1998 and 2004 he was elected to the 12th and 14th Lok Sabha (Lower House) from the Balaghat Parliamentary Constituency of Madhya Pradesh. He became a cabinet minister under the M.P. Government headed by Shivraj Singh Chouhan on 20 December 2008.

Positions held

Social and cultural activities
Associated with organising a number of social programmes through Rural Welfare Committee, Landezari; Pandit Deendayal Upadhyaya Rural Upliftment Committee, Village Garra and Agricultural Labourers` Committee, Balaghat.

References

External links
 Members of Fourteenth Lok Sabha - Parliament of India website

Living people
1952 births
India MPs 2004–2009
People from Balaghat
State cabinet ministers of Madhya Pradesh
Bharatiya Janata Party politicians from Madhya Pradesh
India MPs 1998–1999
Lok Sabha members from Madhya Pradesh
Madhya Pradesh MLAs 2018–2023